The Sunda laughingthrush (Garrulax palliatus) is a bird species in the family Leiothrichidae. It is found on the islands of Sumatra and Borneo in Brunei, Indonesia, and Malaysia.

Its natural habitats are subtropical or tropical moist lowland forests and subtropical or tropical moist montane forests. It is threatened by human activity such as hunting, logging, and trapping.

Description 
The length of its body is characterized as medium size, about 24–25cm.

Diet 
The Sunda laughingthrush primarily eats insects (including beetles, moths, and caterpillars) and seeds.

Subspecies
Two subspecies are recognized:
 Garrulax palliatus palliatus is native to the island of Sumatra, mostly in montane rain forests from 850 to 2,200 meters elevation.
 Garrulax palliatus schistochlamys is native to Borneo (Indonesia, Malaysia and Brunei), mostly in montane rain forest, and sometimes in submontane hill forest, from 300 to 2,010 meters elevation.

References

Garrulax
Birds of Borneo
Birds of Malaysia
Birds of Sumatra
Fauna of the Borneo montane rain forests
Birds described in 1850
Taxa named by Charles Lucien Bonaparte
Taxonomy articles created by Polbot